Bethóc may refer to:
Bethóc, daughter of Malcolm II, King of Scots
Bethóc, Prioress of Iona, daughter of Somerled, Lord of Argyll
Bjaðǫk, Queen of Norway, wife of Harald IV of Norway